The Damour massacre took place on January 20, 1976, during the 1975–1990 Lebanese Civil War. Damour, a Maronite Christian town on the main highway south of Beirut, was attacked by the left-wing militants of the Palestine Liberation Organisation and as-Sa'iqa units. Many of its people died in battle or in the massacre that followed, and the others were forced to flee. According to Robert Fisk, the massacre was part of the first act of ethnic cleansing in the Lebanese Civil War. The massacre was in retaliation to the Karantina massacre of Muslims by the Phalangists.

Background
The Damour massacre was a response to the Karantina massacre of January 18, 1976 in which Phalangists, a predominantly-Christian right-wing militia, killed 1,000 to 1,500 people.

The Ahrar and the Phalangist militias, based in Damour, and Dayr al Nama had blocked the coastal road leading to southern Lebanon and the Chouf, which turned them into a threat to the PLO and its leftist and nationalist allies in the Lebanese Civil War.

That occurred as part of a series of events during the Lebanese Civil War in which Palestinians joined the Muslim forces, in the context of the Christian-Muslim divide, and soon Beirut was divided along the Green Line, with Christian enclaves to the east and Muslims to the west.  
  
On 9 January, the militias began a siege of Damour and Jiyeh.  Jiyeh was entered by the PLO on 17 January. Before January 20, more than 15,000 civilians fled Damour.

Events

On January 20, under the command of Fatah and as-Sa'iqa, members of the Palestine Liberation Organization and leftist Muslim Lebanese militiamen entered Damour. Along with twenty Phalangist militiamen, civilians - including women, the elderly, and children, and often comprising whole families - were lined up against the walls of their homes and sprayed with machine-gun fire by Palestinians; the Palestinians then systematically dynamited and burned these homes. Several of the town's young women were separated from other civilians and gang-raped. Estimates of the number killed range from 100 to 582, with the overwhelming majority of these being civilians; Robert Fisk puts the number of civilians massacred at nearly 250. Among the killed were family members of Elie Hobeika and his fiancée. For several days after the massacre, 149 bodies of those executed by the Palestinians lay in the streets; this included the corpses of many women who had been raped and of babies who were shot from close range in the back of the head. In the days following the massacre, Palestinians and Lebanese Muslims, some of whom were high on hashish, exhumed the coffins in the town's Christian cemetery and scattered the skeletons of several generations of the town's deceased citizens in the streets. 

After the Battle of Tel al-Zaatar later that year, the PLO resettled Palestinian refugees in Damour. After the Israeli invasion of Lebanon in 1982, the Zaatar refugees were expelled from Damour and the original inhabitants brought back.

According to Thomas L. Friedman, the Phalangist Damouri Brigade, which carried out the Sabra and Shatila massacre during the 1982 Lebanon War, sought revenge not only for the assassination of Bachir Gemayel but also for what he describes as past killings of their own people by Palestinians, including those at Damour. According to the International Center for Transitional Justice, the leadership of Fatah and as-Sa'iqa made a decision to "empty the city." 

According to an eyewitness, the attack took place from the mountain behind the town. "It was an apocalypse," said Father Mansour Labaky, a Christian Maronite priest who survived the massacre. "They were coming, thousands and thousands, shouting 'Allahu Akbar! (God is great!) Let us attack them for the Arabs, let us offer a holocaust to Mohammad!", and they were slaughtering everyone in their path, men, women and children."

According to Robert Fisk, women were gang-raped and babies were shot from close range; houses belonging to Christians were also systematically destroyed, and graves of the Christian cemetery were dug up and old skeletons scattered in the streets.

Perpetrators
There are varying claims about the precise composition of the forces that committed the massacre at Damour. According to some, bulk of the attacking forces seems to have been composed of brigades from the Palestinian Liberation Army and as-Sa'iqa, as well as other members of other groups, including Fatah, as well as the Muslim Lebanese al-Murabitun militia. Others contend that there were no Lebanese involved in perpetrating the massacre, and that those who committed atrocities were Palestinians from the Fatah, Popular Front for the Liberation of Palestine, and Democratic Front for the Liberation of Palestine along with militiamen from Syria, Jordan, Libya, Iran, Pakistan and Afghanistan, and possibly even Japanese Red Army terrorists who were then undergoing training by the Popular Front for the Liberation of Palestine in Lebanon.   

Some sources suggest that Yasser Arafat, who had authorized the PLO to participate in the attack, wanted to execute the local PLO commanders afterwards for what they had permitted; others claim that Arafat had "direct control" of the forces conducting the massacre.

In popular culture 
The Damour massacre has not received as much attention as the one in Sabra and Shatila, but nevertheless has still garnered some attention in popular culture.

The Insult, a film by the Lebanese-French director, Ziad Doueiri, about a lawsuit between a Palestinian-Lebanese refugee who fled after the Jordanian Civil War, and a Lebanese Christian who survived the Damour massacre, was nominated for the Oscars in 2018.

See also
List of massacres in Lebanon
Persecution of Christians
Karantina massacre
South Lebanese Army
Saad Haddad
The Insult (film), a 2017 movie by Ziad Doueiri where the Damour massacre plays an important role.
Aishiyeh massacre

Notes

References
 Abraham, A. J. (1996). The Lebanon War. Praeger/Greenwood. 
 Fisk, Robert. (2001). Pity the Nation: Lebanon at War. Oxford: Oxford University Press. 
 Friedman, Thomas. (1998) From Beirut To Jerusalem. 2nd Edition. London: HarperCollins. 
 Nisan, M. (2003). The Conscience of Lebanon: A Political Biography of Etienne Sakr (Abu-Arz). London: Routledge. .

Further reading
 Becker, Jillian. (1985).  The PLO: The Rise and Fall of the Palestine Liberation Organization . New York: St. Martin's Press

External links
 Lebanese Civil War 1975 – 1976 Includes pictures of the Syrian-formed and -sponsored groups (Yarmouk and Sai'qa) attacking Damour city (January 1976).
 Country profile: Lebanon
Photographs from a page sympathetic to the Lebanese Forces
 Country profile: Lebanon
Arafat's Massacre of Damour

Conflicts in 1976
Massacres of the Lebanese Civil War
1976 in Lebanon
Mass murder in 1976
Massacres in 1976
Palestinian terrorism
Persecution of Christians by Muslims
January 1976 events in Asia
War crimes in Lebanon
Mount Lebanon Governorate
1976 murders in Lebanon
Massacres of Christians in Lebanon
Massacres committed by the Palestine Liberation Organization